Dispersion may refer to:

Economics and finance
Dispersion (finance), a measure for the statistical distribution of portfolio returns
Price dispersion, a variation in prices across sellers of the same item
Wage dispersion, the amount of variation in wages encountered in an economy
Dispersed knowledge, notion that any one person is unable to perceive all economic forces

Science and mathematics

Mathematics
Statistical dispersion, a quantifiable variation of measurements of differing members of a population
Index of dispersion, a normalized measure of the dispersion of a probability distribution

Dispersion point, a point in a topological space the removal of which leaves the space highly disconnected

Physics
The dependence of wave velocity on frequency or wavelength:
Dispersion (optics), for light waves
Dispersion (water waves), for water waves
Acoustic dispersion, for sound waves
Dispersion relation, the mathematical description of dispersion in a system
Modal dispersion, spreading of signals in multimode fibers and waveguides by a distortion mechanism
Polarization mode dispersion, a form of modal dispersion
Dielectric dispersion, the dependence of the permittivity of a dielectric material on the frequency of an applied electric field
Dispersive mass transfer, in fluid dynamics, the spreading of mass from areas of high to low concentration
Atmospheric dispersion modeling, mathematical simulation of how air pollutants disperse in the ambient atmosphere
London dispersion force, an instantaneous induced dipole-induced dipole
Dispersed particle resistance, a measured parameter to characterize battery active materials

Other sciences
Biological dispersal, the distribution of animals, spores, fruits and their seeds, etc.
Dispersion (chemistry), a system in which particles are dispersed in a continuous phase of a different composition
Dispersion (geology), a process whereby sodic soil disperses when exposed to water
Dispersion (materials science), the fraction of atoms of a material exposed to the surface
Dispersion polymerization, a polymerization process
Velocity dispersion, the statistical variation of velocities about the mean velocity for a group of astronomical objects

Other uses
Hellenistic Judaism#Hellenism, Jewish communities who lived amongst the gentiles in the first century CE
Dispersion (album), the second album by High Rise
Dispersion Technology, a scientific instrument manufacturer located in Bedford Hills, New York

See also

 
Dispersal (disambiguation)
Dispersive (disambiguation)
Dispersity, a measure of the heterogeneity of sizes of molecules or particles in a mixture